The 2013–14 Delaware Fightin' Blue Hens men's basketball team represented the University of Delaware during the 2013–14 NCAA Division I men's basketball season. The Fightin' Blue Hens, led by eighth year head coach Monté Ross, played their home games at the Bob Carpenter Center and were members of the Colonial Athletic Association. They finished the season 25–10, 14–2 in CAA play to win the CAA regular season championship. They were also champions of the CAA tournament to earn an automatic bid to the NCAA tournament where they lost in the second round to Michigan State.

Roster

Schedule

|-
!colspan=9 style="background:#00539f; color:#FFD200;"| Regular season

|-
!colspan=9 style="background:#00539f; color:#FFD200;"| CAA tournament

|-
!colspan=9 style="background:#00539f; color:#FFD200;"| NCAA tournament

References

Delaware Fightin' Blue Hens men's basketball seasons
Delaware
Delaware
Fight
Fight